Sebastián Elizalde (born June 20, 1990) is a Mexican professional baseball outfielder for the Sultanes de Monterrey of the Mexican League (LMB) and the Tomateros de Culiacán of the Mexican Pacific League (LMP).

Career

Sultanes de Monterrey
On April 24, 2010, Elizalde signed with the Sultanes de Monterrey of the Mexican League. Elizalde played with Monterrey through the 2013 season

Cincinnati Reds
On May 7, 2013, Elizalde signed minor league contract with Cincinnati Reds. In 2014, Elizalde split time between the Single-A Dayton Dragons and the advanced Single-A Bakersfield Blaze, hitting a combined .289 and an OPS of .380 with 16 home runs and 60 walks. He spent the 2015 season with the advanced Single-A Daytona Tortugas and the 2016 season with the Double-A Pensacola Blue Wahoos. Elizalde began the 2017 season as the Triple-A Louisville Bats everyday first baseman.

Sultanes de Monterrey (second stint)
On May 3, 2018, Elizalde was loaned to the Sultanes de Monterrey of the Mexican League.

Cincinnati Reds (second stint)
On January 10, 2019, Elizalde signed a minor league contract with the Cincinnati Reds organization.

Sultanes de Monterrey (third stint)
On June 21, 2019, Elizalde was loaned to the Sultanes de Monterrey. He finished the season in Monterrey slashing .313/.389/.414 in 39 contests. After the 2019 season, he played for Tomateros de Culiacán of the Mexican Pacific League (LMP). He has also played for Mexico in the 2020 Caribbean Series.

New York Mets
On February 3, 2020, Elizalde signed minor league contract with New York Mets. On May 28, 2020, Elizalde released by Mets. After the 2020 season, he played for Tomateros of the LMP. Elizalde enjoyed a great season slashing .282/.344/.553 and was awarded the Mexican Pacific League MVP. He also played for Mexico in the 2021 Caribbean Series.

On March 11, 2021, Elizalde re-signed with the Mets on a minor league contract. He was released on June 18, 2021.

Sultanes de Monterrey (fourth stint)
On June 18, 2021, Elizalde signed with the Sultanes de Monterrey of the Mexican League.

International career
Elizalde was chosen for the Mexico national baseball team at the 2017 World Baseball Classic.

References

External links

1990 births
Living people
Baseball players from Sonora
Bakersfield Blaze players
Dayton Dragons players
Daytona Tortugas players
Louisville Bats players
Mexican expatriate baseball players in the United States
Mexican League baseball outfielders
Naranjeros de Hermosillo players
National baseball team players
Pensacola Blue Wahoos players
People from Guaymas
Sultanes de Monterrey players
Tomateros de Culiacán players
2017 World Baseball Classic players
Baseball players at the 2020 Summer Olympics
Olympic baseball players of Mexico